Saint Thyrsus  or Thyrse  (literally "thyrsus"; Spanish and ; ; died 251) is venerated as a Christian martyr. He was killed for his faith in Sozopolis (Apollonia), Phrygia, during the persecution of Decius. Leucius  (Λεύκιος Leúkios) and Callinicus  (Καλλίνικος Kallínīkos) were martyred with him.  Tradition states that Thyrsus endured many tortures and was sentenced to be sawn in half.  However, the saw did not penetrate as it became so heavy that the executioners could not use it. Saint Leucius, after reproaching the governor, Cumbricius, was hanged, harrowed on his sides, and then beheaded.  Callinicus, a pagan priest, was converted after seeing the martyrdom of Thyrsus and was also beheaded.

Veneration
 
Thyrsus' relics were brought to Constantinople. His cult became popular in the Iberian Peninsula since the Middle Ages, initially known as Santo Tirso, remaining as that only in Portugal, as it changed to San Tirso in Spain. Thyrsus had a full office in the Mozarabic liturgy. Some of his relics were brought to France: Thyrsus is thus the titular saint of the cathedral of Sisteron in the Basses Alpes, the Cathédrale Notre Dame et Saint Thyrse.  Thyrsus is thus the patron saint of Sisteron. A 12th-century church was also dedicated to him at Châteauponsac.

References

External links

Index of Saints website with thousands of saints, and sources. (an archived, earlier version of "Saint of the Day" at www.saintpatrickdc.org)
 http://www.catholic.org/saints/saint.php?saint_id=2333
 http://www.santiebeati.it/dettaglio/81370

251 deaths
Saints from Roman Anatolia
3rd-century Christian martyrs
Year of birth unknown